Bazooband is a 1954 Bollywood film.

Story
The ancient forces of Virtue and Vice, from times immemorial, are in combat for supremacy of one over the other.

Cast

 Balraj Sahni
 Sulochana Chatterjee
 Om Prakash
 Anwar Hussain
 Roopmala
 Ramesh Kapoor
 Baby Saroj

Songs
Lyrics written by Prem Dhawan.
"Man Me Laagi Aag, O Maalik Kya Tu Bhi Soya" - Lata Mangeshkar
"Bazooband Khul Khul Jaye" - Lata Mangeshkar
"Dil Ki Mehfil Me Aake Chale Ho Kaha" - Lata Mangeshkar
"Aarzoo Ye Hai Ke Nikle Dam Tumhare Samne" - Lata Mangeshkar
"Bina Dosh Sita Mata Ko Diya Ram Ne GharSe Nikal" - Asha Bhosle
"Diya Bujhaao Jhatpat Jhatpat" - G. M. Durrani
"Meri Wohi Tamanna Tere Wohi Bahane" - Lata Mangeshkar

References

External links
 

1954 films
1950s Hindi-language films
Films scored by Mohammed Shafi
Indian black-and-white films